North Little Rock is a city in Pulaski County, Arkansas, across the Arkansas from Little Rock in the central part of the state. The population was 64,591 at the 2020 census. In 2019 the estimated population was 65,903, making it the seventh-most populous city in the state. North Little Rock, along with Little Rock and Conway, anchors the six-county Little Rock–North Little Rock–Conway Metropolitan Statistical Area (2014 population 729,135), which is further included in the Little Rock-North Little Rock Combined Statistical Area with 902,443 residents.

The city's downtown is anchored in the Argenta Historic District, the location of Dickey-Stephens Park, home of the Arkansas Travelers minor league baseball team, and Simmons Bank Arena, the metropolitan area's main entertainment venue. Farther west is Burns Park, one of the largest municipal parks in the United States.

History
Originally named Argenta, Arkansas, it was founded on April 18, 1871. In 1890, the city of Little Rock annexed Argenta as part of its eighth ward, preempting a competing petition to incorporate. As part of a plan to reclaim its independence, Argenta was incorporated on July 17, 1901, as the town of "North Little Rock". By 1904, the state's supreme court allowed North Little Rock to annex what was left of the ward. It readopted the name Argenta in 1906, only to revert to North Little Rock in October 1917. Evidence of the old town can still be found in the North Little Rock City Hall (built in 1914) which contains plaques referring to Argenta, and incorporates "C of A" (i.e. City of Argenta) ornamental features.

Geography

Neighborhoods
Amboy
Argenta Historic District
Arrowhead Manor
Chimney Rock
Crystal Hill
Dark Hollow
Indian Hills
Lakewood
Levy
Mid-City
Overbrook
Park Hill
Pike View
Rose City
Windsor Valley

Climate
The climate in this area is characterized by hot, humid summers and generally mild to cool winters. According to the Köppen Climate Classification system, North Little Rock has a humid subtropical climate, abbreviated "Cfa" on climate maps.

North Little Rock has a humid subtropical climate with long, hot, and sunny summers and mild, wet winters with little snow. January on average is the coldest month, while July is typically the warmest, though occasionally August can claim the distinction. The overall yearly average temperature is 62.5 degrees. Precipitation averages 45.79 inches a year, with winter and spring tending to be wetter than summer and autumn. Severe thunderstorms can occur, especially during the Spring, on April 25, 2011, a possible tornado struck the air force base in the city.

Demographics

2020 census

As of the 2020 United States Census, there were 64,591 people, 27,903 households, and 14,720 families residing in the city.

2010 census
As of the census of 2010, there were 62,304 people, 25,542 households, and 16,117 families residing in the city. The city was 54.02% White, 39.73% Black or African American, 0.41% Native American, 0.94% Asian, 0.07% Pacific Islander, 2.71% from other races, and 2.14% from two or more races. 5.71% of the population were Hispanic or Latino of any race.

There were 25,542 households, out of which 28.9% had children under the age of 18 living with them, 41.9% were married couples living together, 17.6% had a female householder with no husband present, and 36.9% were non-families. 32.0% of all households were made up of individuals, and 12.2% had someone living alone who was 65 years of age or older. The average household size was 2.35 and the average family size was 2.97.

In the city, the population was spread out, with 25.5% under the age of 18, 9.0% from 18 to 24, 28.4% from 25 to 44, 22.5% from 45 to 64, and 14.6% who were 65 years of age or older. The median age was 36 years. For every 100 females, there were 87.7 males. For every 100 females age 18 and over, there were 82.9 males.

The median income for a household in the city was $35,578, and the median income for a family was $43,595. Males had a median income of $31,420 versus $24,987 for females. The per capita income for the city was $19,662. About 12.4% of families and 16.1% of the population were below the poverty line, including 26.5% of those under age 18 and 11.7% of those age 65 or over.

Arts and culture

Points of interest

 Argenta Historic District
 Argenta Plaza 
 Arkansas National Guard Museum
 Burns Park
 Simmons Bank Arena with the Arkansas Sports Hall of Fame Museum
 McCain Mall
 Lakewood Village 

Sports
Dickey-Stephens Park is the location of the Arkansas Travelers baseball team.

Parks and recreation
 Arkansas River Trail
Big Rock Quarry Park, which includes a Bike Park and Pump Track
 Burns Park, one of the largest city-owned parks in the United States, contains a baseball and softball complex, soccer complex, campground, two golf courses, hiking trails, amusement park, and tennis complex.
Campbell Lake Park
Conley Park
Crestview Park
Emerald Park
Fearneyhough Park
Idlewild Park
North Little Rock Riverfront Park (formally known as North Shore Riverwalk Park)
Riverview Park, includes a skate park with street elements and a bowl
 T. R. Pugh Memorial Park, location of the Old Mill in the movie Gone With The Wind
Vestal Park
W.C. Faucette Memorial Park
Witkowski Park

Government
The City of North Little Rock elected officials are a mayor, city council of city council members (eight total, with two from each of the four wards), city clerk/treasurer, city attorney, and two judges. This is supplemented by a number of boards and commissions composed of city officials and residents.

Intergovernmental Relations
North Little Rock is home to the headquarters of the Arkansas Municipal League (AML), the state's only municipal representation organization. AML prides itself on providing leadership to each city or town before the state and federal governments. It is also a place for discussion and sharing of mutual concerns.

Education

Public primary and secondary schools
Most students attend public schools in the North Little Rock School District which includes:

 One high school
North Little Rock High School grades 9-12
 One middle school
North Little Rock Middle School, which is subdivided into a 6th grade campus and a 7-8th grade campus
 Nine elementary schools
 Amboy Elementary
 Boone Park Elementary
 Crestwood Elementary
 Glenview Elementary
 Indian Hills Elementary
 Lakewood Elementary
 Meadow Park Elementary
 Ridge Road Elementary (formerly Ridge Road Middle School)
 Seventh Street Elementary
 One early childhood center
 Pike View Early Childhood Center

The North Little Rock High School West Campus facility is listed on the National Register of Historic Places for its art-deco architecture style.

In addition, the Pulaski County Special School District administers several other North Little Rock area schools, including:
 one middle school, and
 three elementary schools and one elementary magnet school.

Scipio Jones High School, the segregated public school for black children, was established in 1909 and disestablished in 1970.

Private primary and secondary schools
In North Little Rock there are a number of private schools:

Calvary Academy (PreK3-12)
Central Arkansas Christian Schools (PreK3-12)
Immaculate Conception (K-8)
North Little Rock Montessori
North Little Rock Catholic Academy (PreK3-8)
Formed in 2007 by the merger of St. Mary School and St. Patrick School.

North Little Rock previously had a Catholic grade school for black people, St. Augustine School. It closed in 1976.

Post-secondary education
 University of Arkansas – Pulaski Technical College
 Shorter College (Arkansas)
 Arkansas College of Barbering and Hair Design
 New Tyler Barber College
 Diesel Driving Academy
 Lee's School of Cosmetology
 The Salon Professional Academy
 National Real Estate School
 U.S. Dept of Veterans Affairs Police Law Enforcement Training Center

Public libraries
The North Little Rock Public Library System has two branches: the Argenta Branch Library and the William F. Laman branch, which was named after a former mayor.

Infrastructure

Transportation

Highways
North Little Rock is also the eastern terminus of Interstate 30 and southern terminus of the Arkansas-designated portion of Interstate 57. Interstate 40, US 65, US 67, and US 167 all run through the city.

Bus
North Little Rock is home to the headquarters of Rock Region Metro, Arkansas's largest transit agency. Before 2015, it was known as CATA (Central Arkansas Transit Authority). That same year, all of CATA's former buses were retrofitted to be energy-efficient. Rock Region's main bus terminal is located in Little Rock nearby the city's River Market. Rock Region also has the Metro Rail streetcars, which are a group of classic black and yellow streetcars that can be seen in Little Rock’s River Market and North Little Rock’s Argenta.

Air
In the city's northern part is the North Little Rock Municipal Airport. It has several hangars and is frequented by people who fly biplanes. It is a reliever airport for Clinton National Airport. It is also home to the National Weather Service North Little Rock, Arkansas. This is a major weather service authority in the region and frequently works with major media platforms to inform Arkansans of weather patterns in the state.

Police

The North Little Rock Police Department operates unmanned aerial vehicles and has been working with a small pilotless helicopter since 2008.

Fire department
In addition to fire and EMS calls, the North Little Rock Fire Department (NLRFD) responds to calls for their Special Operations Response Team, Haz Mat Response Team, and Water Rescue for the Arkansas River.

Hospitals
Baptist Health Medical Center - North Little Rock
Eugene J. Towbin Healthcare Center
Arkansas Surgical Hospital

Notable residents
Joey Lauren Adams, actress and director
Ben M. Bogard, American Baptist Association founder, clergyman in North Little Rock from 1903 to 1909
Maxine Brown, country singer (of The Browns fame)
John Burkhalter, businessman and politician
A. J. Burnett, former Major League Baseball (MLB) pitcher
Maurice Clemmons, perpetrator of 2009 Lakewood shooting
Donnie Copeland, Pentecostal pastor and member of the Arkansas House of Representatives for District 38
Jeremy Davis, bassist for pop-punk band Paramore
Pat Hays, former mayor of North Little Rock
Cliff Hoofman, Justice on the Arkansas Supreme Court
Jerry Jones, owner of the Dallas Cowboys
Glenn Myatt, Major League Baseball catcher
Darren McFadden, Dallas Cowboys running back
Tommy Norman, North Little Rock Police Officer, known for positive community policing 
Frank Page, radio broadcaster, attended school in North Little Rock
Charles Robinson, Arkansas State Treasurer
Mary Steenburgen, actress
Jason White, guitarist for Green Day
Pharoah Sanders, jazz saxophonist

Sister cities
  Uiwang, South Korea

Notes

References

External links

 
 
 
 
 North Little Rock Chamber of Commerce
 North Little Rock Welcome Center
 

 
1871 establishments in Arkansas
Arkansas populated places on the Arkansas River
Cities in Arkansas
Cities in Pulaski County, Arkansas
Cities in Little Rock–North Little Rock–Conway metropolitan area
Populated places established in 1871
Little Rock, Arkansas, North